Émile Henri Lachapelle (12 September 1905 – February 1988) was a Swiss rowing coxswain and sailor who competed in the 1924 Summer Olympics and  in the 1948 Summer Olympics.

In 1924 he won the gold medal as coxswain with the Swiss boat in the coxed pair event. At the same Olympic Games, he replaced Walter Loosli as coxswain for the final in the coxed four and won a second gold medal.

In 1948 he was a member of the Swiss boat Ylliam VII which finished seventh in the 6 metre class competition.

References

External links
 
 

1905 births
1988 deaths
Swiss male rowers
Swiss male sailors (sport)
Coxswains (rowing)
Olympic rowers of Switzerland
Olympic sailors of Switzerland
Rowers at the 1924 Summer Olympics
Sailors at the 1948 Summer Olympics – 6 Metre
Olympic gold medalists for Switzerland
Olympic medalists in rowing
Medalists at the 1924 Summer Olympics
European Rowing Championships medalists
20th-century Swiss people